Miguel "Mike" Noha was a U.S. soccer forward.  He spent at least five seasons in the American Soccer League and earned one cap with the U.S. national team.

Professional career
Born in the barrio of Villa Urquiza, Noha played football with local side Defensores de Villa Maipú in the Argentine league. In 1959, he moved to the United States, where he played for the Philadelphia Ukrainian Nationals until a knee injury ended his career in 1974.  He was the ASL leading scorer during the 1959-1960 season with twenty-two goals.  That season, Noha also gained a "double" when the Ukes won the ASL and National Challenge Cup titles.  They won the National Cup in a 5-2 victory over the Los Angeles Kickers with Noha scoring all five Philly goals.  Philadelphia repeated as league and National Cup champions in 1960-1961.  While Noha did not lead the league in scoring, he was the league MVP.  He was still listed with Philadelphia when he appeared with the national team in 1964. 

In 1962, he played abroad in the Eastern Canada Professional Soccer League with Toronto Roma. He returned to play in the ECPSL in 1963 with the Montreal Ukrainians. After a dispute with club officials he re-signed with Toronto Roma for the remainder of the 1963 season.

National team
Noha earned one cap with the U.S. national team in a 10-0 loss to England on May 27, 1964.

References

1939 births
Footballers from Buenos Aires
United States men's international soccer players
American Soccer League (1933–1983) players
American people of Ukrainian descent
Argentine people of Ukrainian descent
Argentine emigrants to the United States
Philadelphia Ukrainian Nationals players
Living people
American soccer players
Association football forwards
Toronto Ukrainians players
Toronto Roma players
Eastern Canada Professional Soccer League players